Rice's Landing Historic District is a national historic district located at Rice's Landing, Greene County, Pennsylvania.  The district includes 63 contributing buildings, 4 contributing sites, and 5 contributing structures in the borough of Rice's Landing. The district is dominated by one- to two-story examples of vernacular Victorian, Colonial Revival, and American Craftsman style buildings. Notable non-residential buildings include the Methodist Episcopal Church (1873), brick jail (1850s), W.A. Young & Sons Foundry & Machine Shop (a National Historic Landmark), Excelsior Pottery, Rice's Landing National Bank building, Hughes store, and the Nash-Rambler Garage.  Contributing structures include the remains of Monongahela River Lock Number 6, concrete bridge (1914), railroad bridge (1913), railroad tunnel (1913), and Dilworth Mine related structures.

It was added to the National Register of Historic Places in 1992.

References

Historic districts on the National Register of Historic Places in Pennsylvania
Colonial Revival architecture in Pennsylvania
Buildings and structures in Greene County, Pennsylvania
National Register of Historic Places in Greene County, Pennsylvania